George Smith "Babe" Wanless (July 13, 1898 – November 1, 1961) was an American football player.  

Wanless was born in Louisville, Kentucky, in 1898.

He played professional football as a back, end, and guard for the Louisville Brecks in the National Football League (NFL). He appeared in three NFL games during the 1922 and 1923 seasons. 

After his football career ended, Wanless became an automobile dealer in Louisville. In 1924, he became the youngest Ford dealer. He had dealerships in both Louisville and West Point, Kentucky. In 1950, he moved to Tarpon Springs, Florida.  He became manager of the Tarpon Springs chamber of commerce starting in 1956.  He died in Tampa, Florida, in 1961.

References

1898 births
1961 deaths
Louisville Brecks players
Players of American football from Louisville, Kentucky